The guilds of Florence were secular corporations that controlled the arts and trades in Florence from the twelfth into the sixteenth century. These Arti included seven major guilds (collectively known as the Arti Maggiori), five middle guilds (Arti Mediane) and nine minor guilds (Arti Minori). Their rigorous quality control and the political role in the commune that the Arti Maggiori assumed were formative influences in the history of Florence, which became one of the richest cities of late Medieval Europe.

The popolo minuto—skilled workers including weavers, spinners, dyers, boatmen, laborers, peddlers and others—despite constituting a majority of the population, were barred from forming guilds.

Formation of the Arti
The guilds, medieval institutions that organized every aspect of a city's economic life, formed a social network that complemented and in part compensated for family ties, although in Florence the welfare side of the guilds' activities was less than in many cities. The first of the guilds of Florence of which there is notice is the Arte di Calimala, the cloth-merchants' guild, mentioned in a document of about 1150. By 1193 there existed seven such corporate bodies, which each elected a council whose members bore the Roman-sounding designation consoli. A single capo was elected to manage all the business of the guild.

Entrance to the Arti was highly structured from the first records; it was necessary to be the legitimate son of a member, to give proofs of competence in the craft involved, and to pay an entrance tax. Masters of the guilds, who possessed the means of production, took on apprentices and garzoni, the "boys" or journeymen who might work through a long career without ever becoming a master.

[[File:Tribunale di Mercatanzia.jpg|thumb|The Tribunale di Mercatanzia]]
Each of the Arti was ruled according to its statutes, which had the force of law, and might pass judgement in controversies among its members and with their workers. In the fourteenth century the guilds established the market tribunal called the Mercatanzia to hear causes that involved more than one of the Arti. The Palazzo del Tribunale della Mercatanzia (illustration, right) still occupies a prominent place in the piazza della Signoria, befitting the controlling role of the Arti in governing Florence.

As elsewhere, the guilds of Florence protected its members from competition within the city by strangers and Florentine outsiders, guaranteed the quality of work through strict supervision of the workshops (botteghe), stipulated work hours, established markets and feast days, and provided public services to its members, and their wives, widows and children. During the fifteenth century city watchmen were organized by the Arti to protect closed workshops and warehouses.

From the beginning, not all Arti were equal: to the original seven Arti Maggiori were added fourteen Arti Minori as the guild system spread.

Role in Florence

Six of the nine Priori of the Signoria of Florence were selected from the major guilds, and two were selected by the minor guilds.<ref
name="mcc">McClelland, Aaron D. "Government of Florence." Quattrocento Project.</ref> The "Seven Greater Guilds" are first mentioned distinctly (separating the Calimala from "Wool") in 1197. The first State enactment appertaining to Guilds was not issued until 1228.

The first scheduled list of Florentine guilds encompassing twenty-one guilds, appeared in 1236. The second scheduled list of the twenty-one guilds, differentiating between seven "Greater" Guilds (Arti Maggiori) and fourteen "Lesser" Guilds (Arti Minori), appeared in 1266. That same year the consuls of the seven "Greater" Guilds became the "Supreme Magistrate of the State". In 1280, the first five of the "Lesser Guilds" were designated "Intermediate Guilds" (Arti Mediane), when the Signoria first assumed office, and their consults were admitted to the conferences of the consuls of the seven "Greater" Guilds.

In 1282, three "Priors of the Guilds" were elected, with powers only inferior to the Chief-Magistrate of the State. The
third scheduled list of guilds, finalizing their order of precedence for over a century appeared in a 1282 document known as the Foro Fiorentino, currently held at British Library. The 1282 document groups the greater and intermediary guilds together, thus creating a new partition of twelve greater guilds and nine minor guilds. The nine lowest guilds
were allotted banners and coats-of-arms in 1291.

A General Code, a "Statuto", for the guilds was promulgated in 1296 with the founding of the Corte della Mercanzia. The Statutes of all the guilds underwent a complete revision between 1301 and 1307, and the "New Code" was first adopted by the Calimala; the statutes were again revised in 1386.

Three new operative guilds were formed in 1378 after the Ciompi revolt. The fourth scheduled
list of guilds, appearing in 1415, however, still included only twenty-one guilds, partitioned (as in 1266) between seven greater guilds and fourteen lesser guilds (the intermediary ones having lost their special status).

The greater guilds attempted in 1427 to reduce the lesser guilds to only seven. This was defeated. But in 1534, the fourteen lesser guilds were arranged into four
Universities, and saw many of their privileges curtailed.

Arti Maggiori

Arti Mediane

Arti Minori

Artists
In Florence a separate Guild of Saint Luke for artists did not exist. Painters belonged to the guild of the Doctors and Apothecaries (Arte dei Medici e Speziali) as they bought their pigments from the apothecaries, while sculptors were members of the Masters of Stone and Wood (Maestri di Pietra e Legname), or the metalworkers if working in that medium. They were also frequently members in the confraternity of St. Luke (Compagnia di San Luca)—which had been founded as early as 1349—although it was a separate entity from the guild system. In the sixteenth century, the Compagnia di San Luca began to meet at SS. Annunziata, and sculptors, who had previously been members of a confraternity dedicated to St. Paul (Compagnia di San Paolo), also joined. This form of the compagnia developed into the Florentine Accademia e Compagnia delle arti del Disegno in 1563, which was then formally incorporated into the city's guild system in 1572.

The guilds were important patrons of the arts. The statues of the Orsanmichele were a lavish joint, and highly competitive, effort, the Calimala were responsible for the Baptistry and paid for Ghiberti's famous doors, while the Lana were responsible for the cathedral itself, and paid for the cupola, the altar frontal and other works, and the Seta built and ran the Ospedale degli Innocenti.

 Universities 

Given the prominent role of the guilds in the government of Florence, in 1427, Florentine greater nobles, led by Rinaldo degli Albizzi and Niccolò da Uzzano, attempted to introduce measures in the Signoria of Florence to reduce the number of minor guilds from fourteen to seven, thereby reducing the number of their representatives in the government. This attempt was narrowly defeated, largely by the singular efforts of Giovanni di Bicci de' Medici, an action which cemented the popularity of the Medici family among the common burghers (against the Grandi) and helped them rise to power. But a little over a century later, another Medici, Cosimo I de' Medici, Grand Duke of Tuscany, reduced the number of minor guilds from fourteen to four, by grouping disparate guilds together into "universities". The four new universities organized by the law of July 17, 1534 were:

 L'Università di Por San Piero ("University of St. Peter's Gate") – grouped together the Beccai (butchers), Oliandoli (provisioners) and the Fornai (bakers).
 l'Università de' Fabbricanti ("University of Artificers") – grouped together the guilds of Chiavaiuoli (locksmiths), Maestri di Pietre e Legnami (masters of stone and wood), Corazzai e Spadai (armourers) and Legnaiuoli (carpenters).
 l'Università de' Maestri di Cuoiame ("University of Masters of Leather") – grouped the Calzolai (shoemakers), Galigai (Tanners) and Coreggiai (saddlers).
 l'Università de' Linaiuoli ("University of Linen-drapers") added to the old Linaiuoli guild not only the associated Rigattieri (retailers) and Sarti (tailors), but also the unrelated Vinattieri (vintners) and Albergatori (innkeepers).

The university of Cuoiame was annexed in 1561 by the major guild of Vaiai e Pellicciai (Furriers and Skinners), and the new entity named Arte dei Vaiai e Cuoiame. The universities of San Piero and Fabbricanti were merged in 1583, into a single university, the Università dei Fabbricanti e Por San Piero.

All the Florentine guilds, major and minor, were abolished in 1770, by the decree of Emperor Joseph II (as Grand Duke of Tuscany), assigning their functions to the single Florentine chamber of commerce, art and manufacture (Camera di Commercio, Arti e Manifatture), with the exception of the Arte dei Giudici e Notai (Judges & Notaries), which lingered on until it was finally abolished in 1777 by a new decree.

See also

 Ciompi, guild-less wool carders who revolted in 1378
 Masterpiece

Notes

References
 Hughes, Anthony."'An Academy for Doing'. I: The Accademia del Disegno, the Guilds and the Principate in Sixteenth-Century Florence." Oxford Art Journal, vol. 9, no. 1. (1986), pp. 3–10.
 Jack, Mary Ann. "The Accademia del Disegno in Late Renaissance Florence." In: Sixteenth Century Journal, vol. 7, no. 2. (Oct., 1976), pp. 3–20.
 Mather, Rufus Graves. "Documents Mostly New Relating to Florentine Painters and Sculptors of the Fifteenth Century." In: The Art Bulletin, vol. 30, no. 1. (Mar., 1948), pp. 20–65.
 Staley, John Edgcumbe. 1906. The Guilds of Florence''. Methuen & Co.

External links
Guilded in Florence
Guilds